Wiedemannia kacanskae is a species of dance flies, in the fly family Empididae.

References

Wiedemannia
Insects described in 1993
Diptera of Europe